Robert Salisbury may refer to:
 Sir Robert Salisbury (educationalist), and author of Field of Dreams  
 the pen-name of Robert Gascoyne-Cecil, 7th Marquess of Salisbury (born 1946), political columnist and former leader of the House of Lords
 Robert Gascoyne-Cecil, 3rd Marquess of Salisbury (1830-1903) British prime minister and origin of the phrase "Bob's your uncle".

See also
Robert Salesbury (1567–1599), Welsh politician